The 1992–93 Argentine Primera División was a season of top-flight professional football in Argentina. The league season had two champions, with Boca Juniors winning the Apertura (22nd league title for the club), while Vélez Sársfield won the Clausura championship (2nd league title). Lanús (as champion of 1991–92 Primera B Nacional) and San Martín de Tucumán (winner of "Torneo Dodecagonal" after beating Almirante Brown in a two-legged series) were the teams promoted from the Primera B Nacional (second division).

On the other hand, Talleres de Córdoba and San Martín de Tucumán were related to Primera B Nacional.

Torneo Apertura

Final standings

Top scorers

Relegation
There is no relegation after the Apertura. For the relegation results of this tournament see below

Torneo Clausura

Final standings

Notes
Velez 1-1 Boca: Awarded to Velez 1-0
Talleres (C) 2-2 River Plate: Awarded to River 0-2
Newell's 0-1 Talleres (C): Awarded to Newell's 1-0
Talleres (C) 1-0 Gimnasia y Esgrima (LP): Awarded 0-1 to Gimnasia

Top scorers

Relegation

See also
 1992–93 in Argentine football

References

Argentine Primera División seasons
1992–93 in Argentine football
Argentine
Argentine
es:Torneo Apertura 1992 (Argentina)
fr:Tournoi d'ouverture du championnat d'Argentine de football 1992